James Perry (born ) was an Irish luthier from Dublin, known for making violins, violas and cellos. His workshop was based in Kilkenny and also produced instruments such as guitars, German flutes, fifes and tenors. Perry is credited with having made over 1000 instruments. He was a brother and apprentice of Dublin luthier, Thomas Perry, and a protégé of the Ormonde family of Kilkenny Castle.

Early life

James Perry was born in Dublin around 1759 to John Perry, a Dublin musical instrument maker and landowner in Tinnakill near Raheen, County Laois. James was one of at least three sons that would go on to become successful luthiers. The eldest son, Thomas (born ), started working in Christchurch Yard in Dublin around the same year James was born and would go on to become one of Ireland's most prolific luthiers. The second eldest brother, John (born ), would also become a well-known maker, working at High Street in Belfast from around 1768. Joseph Perry, who was thought to be a cousin of James's, was another highly regarded luthier from Dublin, whose work has been compared to that of English maker Benjamin Banks. James also had a sister, Elizabeth Perry, whose son, William Wilkinson (born ), would apprentice to and later go into partnership with James's brother Thomas.

James was most likely the youngest in the Perry family, almost 20 years his brother Thomas' junior. Growing up, he would have been surrounded by instrument making, with his father and two older brothers all being established instrument makers by the time he was 10 years old. It is likely that, as a young boy, James spent a great deal of time around the workshop in Christchurch Yard, and probably developed a strong penchant for instrument making at a very young age. Furthermore, the surrounding area of Christ Church, where James would have grown up, was also synonymous with violin making in 18th century Dublin, boasting great makers such as Thomas Molineux, George Ward, as well as some of the earliest-known Dublin makers such as John Neale and Thomas Dunne.

Career

James was apprenticed to his brother Thomas at Anglesea Street in Dublin between 1773 and 1780. By then, his brother Thomas had been working independently for nearly 15 years and was a very experienced maker. During his apprenticeship, James honed his skills as a luthier and adopted many traits typical of the Perry school. In particular, he based his instruments on the Stainer model, which his brother Thomas used exclusively throughout the first half of his career. James would also adopt a typical Perry golden brown varnish, f-holes with exaggerated Perry styling and brand his instruments with his mark below the button, a trait that his brother Thomas most likely inherited from his teacher George Ward.

Following his apprenticeship in Dublin, James moved to Kilkenny in 1781 and set up his own shop on a street known as Back Lane. It is possible that he decided to move to Kilkenny to avoid competing with his more established brother and teacher, Thomas, just as his other brother, John, had moved to Belfast around 1768. On August 18, 1781, James posted an advertisement in Finn's Leinster Journal to help spread the word of his new business in Kilkenny which read:

To the LOVERS of MUSIC.

JAMES PERRY, Brother to Thomas Perry, of Anglesea-Street, Dublin, now resides in Back-lane, Kilkenny, where he makes and repairs Violins, Guitars and Tenors, in the best and [...] Manner, and hopes to [...] the Favour and Protection of his Friends and the Public by the strictest Attention to their Commands.

August 18, 1781.

Perry's business soon came under the patronage of the Ormonde family of Kilkenny Castle, as well as other nobility and gentry within the city and county of Kilkenny. He established himself as a general musical instrument maker, producing and repairing instruments such as violins, violas, cellos, guitars, tenors, German flutes and fifes. Perry's shop also sold music, including existing and newly published works. In 1788, Perry is listed in the Dublin Directories as a violin, violoncello and guitar maker at 4 Trinity Street in Dublin. It is possible that he made regular trips back to Dublin, where his family were from, and would work from an address such as this during extended visits. On July 31, 1792, Perry posted another advertisement in Finn's Leinster Journal, this time thanking his patrons and the general public, and stating his commitment to serve them in the future. The advertisement also listed the broad range of services that his shop offered at the time and read as follows:

JAMES PERRY,

Musical Instrument Maker, & Music Seller, Back-lane, Kilkenny,

MOST gratefully returns his sincere Thanks to the Nobility and Gentry of the City and County of Kilkenny, and the Public in general, for the very great and liberal Patronage and Support, with which they have been pleased to Honour him during eleven Years passed in Business—and assures them, that the same assiduous Attention to their Commands, which gained their Favour, shall be constantly attended to.

Having established a Correspondendence with the first Musical Houses in Ireland, he has just laid in and will be constantly supplied with every Article in the Musical Line, as well as that already extant, as every new Production immediately after its Publication. His Violins, Violoncellos, Tenors, Guitars, German Flutes of different Sizes, Fifes, &c he flatters himself will equal those of any other Maker in Ireland. He likewise repairs all the above Instruments—best Roman Violin Strings, Guitar Wire, plain and covered ruled Paper, blank books, &c.  

July 31, 1792.

Perry's workshop went on to produce over 1000 instruments, but, like his brother, Thomas, he would become known for the quality of his violins in particular. While his workmanship was generally considered to be quite rough compared to that of his brother, they were said to have an excellent tone. Their sweet tone would become particularly favorable with Irish traditional players, some favoring his instruments over those of his brother Thomas.

Extant instruments

It is unknown how many instruments Perry produced in his lifetime. Some accounts say that he produced some 300 instruments, although this may refer exclusively to stringed instruments. There are surviving Perry instruments that are labelled with numbers that exceed 1000. It is likely that Perry achieved such a high output by numbering all of the instruments produced by his workshop, including smaller instruments such as flutes, fifes and tenors. Perry would have adopted such a numbering system from his brother, Thomas, who also achieved an extraordinarily high output, most likely in the same manner.

Some of Perry's extant instruments:

Violins
 1776 (no. ?): labelled 'Made by James Perry, Dublin, 1776', LOB: 35.9 cm
 1785 (no. 200): labelled 'Made by James Perry, Kilkenny, No. 200, 1785'
  (no. ?): branded 'J PERRY/KILKENNY', LOB: 35.7 cm
 1799 (no. 1020): labelled 'Made by James Perry, Kilkenny, No. 1020, 1799', LOB: 35.6 cm

Viola d'amores
 1769 (no. ?): Bloomsbury's auction, May 2008, lot 132

Cellos
  (no. ?): branded 'PERRY/KILKENNY'

References

Citations

Bibliography

External links
 James Perry on Dublin Music Trade
 James Perry on Brian Boydell Card Index
 James Perry on Tarisio
 James Perry on Brompton's

1759 births
18th-century Irish businesspeople
19th-century Irish businesspeople
18th-century Irish people
19th-century Irish people
Bowed string instrument makers
Irish luthiers
Irish musical instrument makers